Gear stick §Shift pattern, refers to the layout of the gears on a gear stick
 Shift work §Shift pattern, refers to the various types of work schedules used in different industries